Jammes Luckett, also formerly credited as Jaye Barnes Luckett is an American musician, writer, visual artist, and voice actor.  She became known as the force behind the rock / electronic band Poperratic – as singer, songwriter, multi-instrumentalist, music arranger, music video director and record producer. Likewise, Luckett gained notice as a film and television composer and songwriter; contributing film scores and original songs (across a wide variety of genres) for independent and major projects. Luckett first came to international attention with her work on 2002's May – which has since acquired a cult following.

Art Mechanix
Luckett has frequently released recordings, artwork, zines, stories and other projects via her own imprint, Art Mechanix. Art Mechanix was formerly known as Go Little Records, and was initially founded in 1998.

Music
In addition to her own name, Luckett has also worked under various pseudonyms.  Among the most well-known of these are: Alien Tempo Experiment 13 (or ATE 13), Merkcurie and Poperratic.

Poperratic (1994–2009)
Jammes' one-woman music group, Poperratic, first began as Alien Tempo Experiment 13, also known as ATE 13. With Go Little Records, she self-released a number of cassette albums.  In 1998, she saw her first 7" Vinyl E.P., "Live! From The Roller Derby" commercially released on the now-defunct New York-based indie label Glimmerfed Records.  The E.P. was co-produced by Luckett, with A.J. Lambert, then-future film director Lucky McKee, and also Don Fleming (musician) the noted music producer who has worked with (Hole, Sonic Youth, Shonen Knife).

Poperratic's music was mostly noted for its catchy melodies, elaborate harmony arrangements, crunchy guitars and unusual structures, all written and performed by Luckett, herself.  Due to the unconventional structures Luckett often uses, as well as storytelling techniques, Luckett's music tends to have a cinematic quality to it.  When asked who his favorite film directors of previous generations who piqued his interest in horror were, Lucky McKee alluded to the fact that he considers Luckett a peer in this regard, by listing Poperratic as a favorite. Comic book illustrator Jordan Crane, of NON-existence Comics once described one of Luckett's early rock releases as  "hitting around PJ Harvey meets the Pixies... with some Beatles."

In early 2007, Poperratic's first studio album, 'Vagus (the wandering nerve.)' was released.  A review at Perrero said of the 'Vagus', "The album overall has a really bluesy old school rock feel, by way of the grrl band movement of the early 90s."

Jammes Luckett
In 2009, Luckett returned to primarily using Jammes Luckett as the credited name for projects, regardless of genre or medium.

Merkcurie
Jammes Luckett has also written and performed electronic music under the project name "Merkcurie".  Merkcurie sometimes features a character called "Merk Shaneley" (voiced by Luckett).

Writing
Jammes' portfolio has shown a long history as a writer of screenplays, stage plays, and short stories, including some ghostwritten for others. In 2012, her newsletter stated that she was working on a science fiction novel, entitled "The Perfect Kind" and various other writing projects.  Luckett has written across a variety of genres including science fiction, contemporary fantasy, paranormal, children's literature, and technical writing.

Acting and Directing
Starting from a young age, Jammes Luckett began acting in the theatre, in dramatic and musical productions.  At times, she served as assistant director and sometimes director of small stage productions.  Among other subjects, Jammes studied animation and filmmaking in college, including at the University of Southern California, where she met frequent collaborator Lucky McKee. McKee has cited Jammes Luckett and Poperratic when asked about the directors who has been most influential on him.

Luckett carried her experience across multiple mediums into her film and voice acting work, often on the same film and television projects she composed and performed original music for.  Some of her most extensive contributions were frequently uncredited.

In 2007, she served as voice talent on an animated pilot called "The Twincesses". Luckett has also scored and acted in a number of films for writer/director Kevin Ford of Mo-Freek Filmworks.

Jammes Luckett has also put her versatility to use as a music video director.  The music video for her original song "Android in Love" was selected to feature on the Website for the 2012 Protoclip Festival International Du Clip Musical (Music Video Festival), in Paris, France. She directed, edited and animated the video, as well as wrote, produced and performed the track.

Art and Design
As a professional designer and visual artist, Jammes Luckett has done album artwork, paintings, interior and furniture design, animation, posters and other art for production companies and studios.

Luckett has frequently and openly stated that she utilizes the influence of visual art, literature and music, interchangeably, in her songwriting, stories, paintings, drawings, and other work.

When film director, writer and actor Lucky McKee was asked who his favorite film directors were of previous generations, who piqued his interest in horror, McKee alluded to the fact that he considers Jammes Luckett somewhat a peer in this regard, by listing Poperratic as a favorite.

This observation was further cemented, when in 2008, McKee recruited Jammes Luckett to create the poster art for his film Blue Like You (2008), which was created for Xbox 360 Live's "Horror Meets Comedy" episodes which debuted on New Xbox Experience. Luckett's poster for the film was printed and distributed at that year's San Diego ComiCon, during an appearance by Lucky McKee and cast.  It was also featured as the broadcast art for the episode, which viewers watched via the Xbox 360 console.

Jammes Luckett also directed music videos for several of her own original songs, which were viewed on the YouTube Website. In addition to directing them, other roles served on the project include as an editor, animator and actor.

Collaborative Works

Film and Television Soundtracks
Luckett's scores earned a reputation for their "haunting melodies and textured atmosphere". Both Ain't It Cool News and The Los Angeles Times cited Luckett as a "composer to watch".
. Most of her early scoring work for Lucky McKee was written, performed and recorded herself; with modest equipment, lending itself to the unconventional nature of her writing.

In honor of her unusual approach to horror music, Luckett was asked to appear at the first "Maestros of Horror" Composer Panel at the 2007 Weekend of Horrors. She appeared beside fellow composers Harry Manfredini, John Harrison, John Murphy, Nathan Barr, and Richard Band, on the same day that soundtrack label La-La Land Records released an early retrospective of her film scoring work.  That release was entitled "May and Other Selected Works of Jaye Barnes Luckett" (LLLCD 1056).  She also appeared on a Weekend of Horrors panel in 2002, with Lucky McKee, Angela Bettis, Anna Faris, and Nichole Hiltz, while promoting May.

Luckett's collaborations with screenwriter/film director McKee, stemmed from their years as students at the University of Southern California, in Los Angeles.  Both also have stated that it was Luckett who originated the role of "May", in a series of short films from the USC-era.  Having played in several bands together, McKee asked her years later to write the score for their first feature, May, which was an expansion of his student films.

In many of Luckett and McKee's collaborative works, Angela Bettis appeared as an actor.  However, for 2007's Roman, which also featured original score and songs by Luckett (as Poperratic), McKee starred in the title role, with Bettis directing.

Luckett scored and/or provided original songs for the following McKee-related films:
'May' (2002) – her first orchestral score for a feature film.  She also provided numerous original songs under the name Alien Tempo Experiment 13, and served as Music Supervisor.
The Woods (2006) – original songs and additional score
Masters of Horror: Sick Girl (2006) – her first television score.  Also featured original Poperratic songs.   This was the tenth episode of the first season of the popular Showtime TV series Masters of Horror
Roman (2007) – her personal favorite of her own scores. Also features original Poperratic songs, and Luckett was co-music supervisor, along with director Angela Bettis.
Blue Like You (2009) – co-wrote and performed the title theme song, for the Xbox 360 Live episode, directed by McKee.

DEUXO
Luckett briefly was one-half of the Electronic Pop / Dance collaboration called DEUXO with fellow musician / producer Schpilkas. The project released a digital E.P. that year called "Tres Deuxo," which shows another side of Luckett's versatility as a synth player, vocalist and co-songwriter. In early 2007, DEUXO's song "MoreSumthin (Fais Do Do)" was featured in the third episode of the FX (TV Network) show Dirt, starring Courteney Cox.

Selected awards and nominations
Sitges Film Festival
Nominated for Best Soundtrack: 'May' (2002)

Notes

External links
Art Mechanix Studio Site

1974 births
Living people
American women writers
American rock musicians
Songwriters from Ohio
American film score composers
American film actresses
American voice actresses
Women film score composers
American women composers
Record producers from Ohio
American music arrangers
21st-century American women musicians
American women record producers
La-La Land Records artists